Dương Văn Thái (born 18 April 1992) is a Vietnamese middle-distance runner specializing in the 800 metres and 1500 metres.

References

External links

1992 births
Living people
Vietnamese male middle-distance runners
Southeast Asian Games medalists in athletics
Southeast Asian Games gold medalists for Vietnam
Southeast Asian Games bronze medalists for Vietnam
Athletes (track and field) at the 2014 Asian Games
Athletes (track and field) at the 2018 Asian Games
Competitors at the 2015 Southeast Asian Games
Asian Games competitors for Vietnam
Competitors at the 2019 Southeast Asian Games
21st-century Vietnamese people